FCA may refer to:

Arts 
 Federation of Canadian Artists
 Foundation for Contemporary Art, in Ghana
 Foundation for Contemporary Arts, in the United States

Business and economics 

 False Claims Act, a United States federal law
 Federal Customs Authority, of the United Arab Emirates
 Foreign currency account
 Free Carrier, an international commerce term similar to FOB
 Full-cost accounting
 Function cost analysis
 Farm Credit Administration, active during the New Deal era
 Fiji Consumers Association
 Financial Collection Agencies, a defunct accounts receivable management company
 Financial Conduct Authority, in the United Kingdom
 Fellow of Chartered Accountants, awarded by various bodies:
 Canadian Institute of Chartered Accountants
 Institute of Chartered Accountants in England and Wales
 Institute of Chartered Accountants of Sri Lanka
 A component of FVA - one of the  X-Value Adjustments in relation to derivative instruments held by banks

Religion 
 Fellowship of Christian Assemblies
 Fellowship of Christian Athletes
 Fellowship of Confessing Anglicans
 Foundation Christian Academy, in Valrico, Florida, United States

Sports
 Cuban Athletics Federation (Spanish )
 FC Aarau, a football club in Switzerland
 FC Astana, a football club in Kazakhstan
 FC Augsburg, a football club in Germany
 Fellowship of Christian Athletes

Transportation

 Fiat Chrysler Automobiles, a defunct multinational automobile manufacturer now part of Stellantis.
 Ferrocarril Central Argentino, an Argentine railway company
 Ferrovia Centro Atlântica, a Brazilian railway company
 First Choice Airways, a defunct British airline
 Florida Coastal Airlines, a defunct American airline
 IATA code for Glacier Park International Airport, in Montana, United States

Other uses
 Facility condition assessment
 Family Caregiver Alliance
 Family Christian Academy (disambiguation), various entities
 Federal Court of Appeal (Canada)
 Federal Court of Australia
 Feline cutaneous asthenia
 Ferengi Commerce Authority
 Finnish Cannabis Association
 Fixed channel allocation, in wireless networks
 Flood Control Act, a series of US federal laws
 Flux-cored arc welding
 Formal concept analysis
 Fórsa Cosanta Áitiúil, the former reserve force of the Irish Army
 Framework Convention Alliance, a tobacco-control organization
 Frontier Closed Area, between Hong Kong and the rest of China
 French Camp Academy, in Mississippi, United States
 Freund's complete adjuvant
 University of Campinas School of Applied Sciences (Portuguese: '')
 Federated Confectioners' Association of Australia, a defunct trade union